Christophe Collignon (born 21 July 1969) is a Belgian politician and a member of the PS. He was elected as a member of the Belgian Senate in 2007.

He is Minister of Local Government and Housing of Wallonia since 2020.

Notes

1969 births
Living people
Socialist Party (Belgium) politicians
Members of the Senate (Belgium)
Members of the Parliament of Wallonia
Members of the Parliament of the French Community
People from Waremme
21st-century Belgian politicians